This is a list of clock towers by location, including only clock towers based on the following definition:

A clock tower is a tower specifically built with one or more (often four) clock faces. Clock towers can be either freestanding or part of a church or municipal building such as a town hall.

The mechanism inside the tower is known as a turret clock which often marks the hour (and sometimes segments of an hour) by sounding large bells or chimes, sometimes playing simple musical phrases or tunes.

Africa

Egypt

Kenya

Libya
Tripoli, Ottoman clock tower (1866–70)

Nigeria

South Africa

Tanzania
 Clock tower in Arusha

Tunisia

Americas

Argentina
 Torre Ader, Buenos Aires
 Torre Monumental, Buenos Aires

Aruba

 Willem III Tower at Fort Zoutman, Oranjestad

Barbados
 Parliament of Barbados, Bridgetown

Brazil

Alagoas
 Torre do Relógio, Piranhas

Amapá
 Marco Zero, Macapá

Amazonas

 Praça Luiza Valério, Itacoatiara
 Relógio Municipal, Manaus

Ceará

 Praça do Relógio, Tianguá
 Praça do Ferreira, Fortaleza
 Praça Coluna da Hora, Sobral

Distrito Federal
 Praça do Relógio, Taguatinga, Federal District

Espírito Santo
 Relógio da Praça Oito, Vitória

Goiás
 Relógio da Avenida Goiás, Goiânia
 Praça Guarda Mor Francisco José Pinheiro, Piracanjuba
 Antiga Estação Ferroviária, Goiânia

Mato Grosso
 Catedral Basílica do Senhor Bom Jesus, Cuiabá

Mato Grosso do Sul
 Relógio Central, Campo Grande
 Relógio Central, Três Lagoas

Minas Gerais

 Praça Rui Barbosa, Belo Horizonte
 Museu da Inconfidência, Ouro Preto
 Basílica Nossa Senhora de Lourdes, Belo Horizonte
 Catedral Nossa Senhora da Boa Viagem, Belo Horizonte
 Belo Horizonte City Hall, Belo Horizonte
 Centro de Cultura Belo Horizonte (CRModa), Belo Horizonte
 Praça Doutor João Penido, Juiz de Fora
 Praça Doutor Jorge Frange, Uberaba
 Torre do Relógio da Paróquia Nossa Senhora Saúde, Lambari
 Igreja Matriz de Nossa Senhora da Conceição, Pedro Leopoldo
 Igreja São José, Belo Horizonte 
 Museu de Artes e Ofícios, Belo Horizonte

Pará
 Praça Siqueira Campos, Belém

Paraíba
 Torre da Igreja do Convento São Francisco de Assis Campina Grande
 Torre da Igreja Nossa Senhora do Rosário Campina Grande
 Torre da Catedral Nossa Senhora da Conceição Campina Grande
 Torre da Igreja Evangélica Congregacional Campina Grande
 Torre da Igreja do Convento Ipuarana Lagoa Seca
 Torre da Igreja do Nossa Senhora de Santana Alagoa Nova
 Torre da Basílica Catedral Nossa Senhora das Neves João Pessoa
 Torre da Igreja Matriz Santa Rita de Cássia Santa Rita
 Torre da Igreja Matriz Nossa Senhora da Conceição Areia
 Torre da Igreja Matriz Nossa Senhora do Bom Conselho Esperança
 Torre da Igreja Matriz Nossa Senhora da Conceição Ingá
 Torre da Igreja Matriz Nossa Senhora das Dores Mogeiro
 Torre da Igreja Matriz Nossa Senhora da Conceição Itabaiana
 Torre da Igreja Matriz Nossa Senhora da Conceição Sapé
 Torre da Igreja Matriz Sagrado Coração de Jesus Mari
 Torre da Igreja Matriz Nossa Senhora do Livramento Bananeiras
 Torre da Igreja Matriz Nossa Senhora das Dores Monteiro
 Torre da Igreja Matriz Nossa Senhora da Conceição Serra Branca
 Torre da Igreja Matriz de São Sebastião São Sebastião do Umbuzeiro
 Torre da Igreja Matriz Nossa Senhora da Conceição Sumé
 Torre da Igreja Matriz de São Sebastião Picuí
 Torre da Igreja Matriz Nossa Senhora do Carmo Borborema
 Torre da Igreja Matriz Sagrado Coração de Jesus Serraria
 Torre da Catedral Nossa Senhora da Luz Guarabira
 Torre da Igreja Matriz Nossa Senhora do Rosário Pirpirituba
 Torre da Igreja Matriz Sagrado Coração de Jesus Pilões
 Torre da Igreja Matriz Santa Maria Madalena Teixeira
 Torre da Igreja Matriz Nossa Senhora do Bom Conselho Princesa Isabel
 Torre da Igreja Matriz Nossa Senhora da Conceição São Mamede
 Torre da Igreja Matriz Nossa Senhora da Piedade Cajazeiras
 Coluna da Hora Praça Getúlio Vargas Pombal
 Torre do Relógio Praça Cel. José Ferreira de Barros São João do Rio do Peixe

Paraná
 Paço da Liberdade, Curitiba
 Torre Nossa Senhora da Glória, Francisco Beltrão
 Praça General Osório, Curitiba
 Curitiba Cathedral, Curitiba

Pernambuco
 Faculdade de Direito do Recife, Recife

Rio Grande do Norte
 Torre da Igreja de Nossa Senhora da Apresentação Natal
 Torre da Igreja Matriz de São Sebastião Parelhas
 Torre da Igreja do Nossa Senhora de Sant'Ana Currais Novos
 Torre da Igreja do Nossa Senhora da Guia Acari
 Torre da Igreja Matriz Nossa Senhora da Conceição Jardim do Seridó
 Torre da Igreja Matriz São José Carnaúba dos Dantas
 Torre da Igreja Nossa Senhora do Rosário Caicó
 Torre da Igreja Matriz de São Sebastião Jucurutu
 Torre da Igreja Matriz de São Sebastião Florânia
 Torre da Igreja Matriz Santa Rita de Cássia Santa Cruz
 Torre da Igreja Matriz Nossa Senhora da Conceição Mossoró
 Torre da Igreja Matriz Nossa Senhora do Ó Serra Negra do Norte

Rio Grande do Sul

 Cathedral of Stone, Canela
 Memorial do Rio Grande do Sul, Porto Alegre
 Igreja Matriz São Pedro, Gramado
 Paço dos Açorianos, Porto Alegre
 Lutheran Parish of Gramado (Evangelical Church of the Lutheran Confession in Brazil), Gramado
 Igreja Evangélica Três Reis Magos, Novo Hamburgo 
 Igreja de São Pelegrino, Caxias do Sul
 Campanário de Pedra, Flores da Cunha

Rio de Janeiro

 Central do Brasil, Rio de Janeiro
 Ilha Fiscal Castle, Rio de Janeiro
 Farol da Mesbla at Paquetá Island, Guanabara Bay
 Pier Mauá Tower, Rio de Janeiro
 Passeio 56 (former Mesbla, Rio de Janeiro

Santa Catarina
 Cathedral of St. Paul the Apostle, Blumenau
 Il Campanario Villaggio Resort at Jurerê Internacional, Florianópolis
 Cathedral of St. Francis of Assisi, Caçador

São Paulo

 Júlio Prestes Station, São Paulo
 Luz Station, São Paulo
 Clock Tower of The Basilica of the National Shrine of Our Lady of Aparecida Clock Tower, Aparecida
 Farol do Jaguaré, São Paulo
 Praça do Relógio at University of São Paulo, São Paulo
 Law School at University of São Paulo, São Paulo
 O Relógio da Sé at Praça da Sé, São Paulo
 CEAGESP, São Paulo
 Metropolitan Cathedral of St. Sebastian, Ribeirão Preto
 Clock Tower at Swiss Park, Campinas
 Catedral Nossa Senhora da Conceição, Franca
 Paranapiacaba, Santo André
 Relógio Félix Guisard - CTI, Taubaté
 Santuário de Santa Terezinha, Taubaté
 Palácio das Indústrias, São Paulo
 Palácio dos Correios, São Paulo
 Paróquia Santo Antonio, São Paulo

Chile
In 2013, a research made by newspaper La Tercera revealed that only 5 out of 25 clock towers are functioning in Santiago, mostly because of financial issues and lack of interest by the owners.
 Cámara de Comercio de Santiago, Santiago
 Intendencia de Santiago, Santiago
 Law School at University of Chile, Santiago
 Chilean National History Museum, Santiago
 San Francisco Church, Santiago

Canada

Alberta
 Edmonton City Hall, Edmonton, Alberta
 Memorial Clock Tower (Cenotaph), Wainwright, Alberta

British Columbia
 Vancouver City Hall, Vancouver, British Columbia

Ontario
 Brampton City Hall, Brampton, Ontario
 Cambridge City Hall, (formerly Galt City Hall) Cambridge, Ontario
 Cathedral Church of St. James, Toronto
 Central Post Office (Ottawa)
 Dominion Building, Brampton
 Hamilton City Hall
 Hart House (University of Toronto), Soldiers' Tower (University of Toronto), Toronto
 Kerr Hall, Ryerson University, Toronto
 Mississauga Civic Centre in Mississauga
 Old City Hall (Toronto), Toronto
 Peace Tower, Parliament Hill Ottawa
 Planet Snoopy (formerly Hanna-Barbera Land), Canada's Wonderland, Vaughan
 Queen Street Viaduct, Toronto
 Queen's Quay Terminal, Toronto
 Ridley College, St. Catharines
 Royal Military College of Canada, Kingston, Ontario
 St. Lawrence Hall, Toronto
 St. Paul's Cathedral (London, Ontario)
 Summerhill-North Toronto CPR Station, Toronto
 Toronto Fire Services Station 227, Toronto
 Upper Canada College, Toronto
 Market Hall Performing Arts Centre, Peterborough, Ontario
 Fire Hall and Police Station, Exhibition Place, Toronto
 Toronto Fire Service Station 315, former Toronto Fire Department Hose Station # 8, Toronto - 1972 replica of 1878 tower
 Press Building, Exhibition Place, Toronto
 former Toronto Fire Department Fire Hall Number 3, Toronto - tower now on top of new commercial building at 484 Yonge Street
 Toronto Fire Station 312, former Toronto FD Hall #10
 former North York Fire Hall # 1 hose drying tower - now located at Princess Park behind Empress Walk
 Etobicoke Civic Centre clock tower, Toronto
 East York Civic Centre, Toronto

Quebec
 Gare du Palais, Quebec City, Quebec
 Montreal Clock Tower, Quebec
 Place d'Armes Clock Tower, Montreal, Quebec

Mexico
 Reloj Monumental, Pachuca, Hidalgo

Peru
 Tower of the University of Saint Mark, Lima

United States

Asia

Bangladesh

China

Bhutan

India

Indonesia

Iran

Israel
Haifa, Ottoman clock tower (c. 1898-1900)
Safed, Ottoman clock tower at the "Saraya" (government house), inaugurated in 1900

Japan

Kuwait

Lebanon

Malaysia

Myanmar

Nepal

Pakistan

Palestine

Philippines

Singapore

Sri Lanka

Saudi Arabia

South Korea

Turkey

 Büyük Saat, Adana
 Dolmabahçe Clock Tower, Istanbul
 Etfal Hospital Clock Tower, Istanbul
 İzmir Clock Tower, İzmir
 İzmit Clock Tower, İzmit
 Nusretiye Clock Tower, Istanbul
 Yıldız Clock Tower, Istanbul

United Arab Emirates

Europe

Albania

Austria
 Graz Clock Tower, Graz

Denmark
 Dipylon Clock Tower in the Carlsberg District, Copenhagen
 City Hall Tower Clock on City Hall Square, Copenhagen

Greece
 Clock Tower of Arta, Greece
 Clock Tower of Giannitsa, Greece
 Clock Tower of Komotini, Greece
 Clock Tower of Saint Nicolas church, Kozani, Greece
 Clock Tower of Xanthi, Greece

Finland
 Central railway station, Helsinki, Finland

France
 Metz railway station, Metz, France

Germany

 Uhrenturm Singer Sewing Machine Company, Wittenberge (1928)
 Replica of the traffic tower of 1924 on Potsdamer Platz, Berlin
 Schwäbisches Turmuhrenmuseum, a museum of tower clocks located in the Silvesterkirche clock tower, Mindelheim

Ireland
 Church of St Anne (Shandon)#ClockIsle of ManChurch of St Anne Clock Tower in Shandon, Cork City

Isle of Man
 Victoria Clock Tower, Foxdale, Isle of Man
 Jubilee Clock, Douglas, Isle of Man

Latvia
 Laima Clock
 Riga Central Station

Lithuania
 Bell tower of Vilnius Cathedral on Cathedral Square, Vilnius

Malta
 Birgu Clock Tower, Birgu (destroyed)

Montenegro

 Sahat kula, Podgorica
 Sahat kula, Ulcinj
 Sahat kula, Pljevlja

Netherlands
 Martinitoren, Groningen

Romania
 Sibiu Evangelical Cathedral, Sibiu, Romania
 Sighişoara Clock Tower, Sighişoara

Russia
 Spasskaya Tower, Moscow

Serbia

 Clock Gate, Kalemegdan, Belgrade

Slovakia
 Michael's Gate, Bratislava

Switzerland
 Einsiedeln Abbey
 Grimmenturm, Zürich
 Zytglogge, Bern

Ukraine
 Simferopol railway station, Simferopol

United Kingdom
 Bank Hall Clock Tower, Bretherton, Lancashire, England
 Central Hotel, Glasgow, Scotland
 City Hall, Cardiff, Wales
 City Hall, Norwich, England
 Civic Centre, Southampton, England
 Clock Tower, Brighton, England
 Clock Tower, Malvern, England
Clock Tower, Knighton, Wales
 Clock Tower, Clevedon, England
 Clock Tower, Epsom, Surrey, England
 Clock Tower, Herne Bay, Kent, England – probably oldest in the UK
 Clock tower, Redcar, North Yorkshire, England
 Clock tower, Surbiton, London, England
 Nottingham Council House, England
 Colchester Clock Tower, Colchester, England
 Elizabeth Tower, Palace of Westminster, London, England (Big Ben is the name of the bell inside)
 Gravesend Clock Tower, Kent, England
 Haymarket Memorial Clock Tower, Leicester, England
 Joseph Chamberlain Memorial Clock Tower, University of Birmingham, England (The tallest freestanding clock tower in the world)
 Jubilee Clock Tower, Weymouth, Dorset, England
 Jubilee Clock Tower, Churchill, North Somerset, England
 King's Cross station, London, England
 Little Ben, London, England
 Liver Building, Liverpool, England
 Memorial Clock, Willenhall, England
 North British Hotel, Edinburgh, Scotland
 Parkinson Building, University of Leeds, England
 St Pancras railway station, London, England
 Tolbooth Steeple, Glasgow, Scotland
 Trent Building, University of Nottingham, England
 Victoria Building, University of Liverpool, England
 Victoria Tower, Liverpool, England

Oceania

Australia
 Adelaide Town Hall, Adelaide, South Australia
 Adelaide General Post Office, Adelaide, South Australia
 Brisbane City Hall, Brisbane, Queensland
 Central Railway Station, Sydney, New South Wales
 Fremantle Town Hall, Fremantle, Western Australia
 General Post Office, Sydney, New South Wales
 Hobart General Post Office, Hobart, Tasmania 
 Launceston Post Office, Launceston, Tasmania
 Kalgoorlie Post Office, Kalgoorlie, Western Australia
 Melbourne Town Hall, Melbourne, Victoria
 Perth Town Hall, Perth, Western Australia
 Sale Clocktower, Sale, Victoria
 Sydney Town Hall, Sydney, New South Wales
 Winthrop Hall, The University of Western Australia, Perth, Western Australia.
 The Nannup Clock Tower, Nannup, Western Australia

New Zealand
Hopwood Clock Tower, Palmerston North

See also
List of tallest clock towers

References

External links
 Towerclocks.org - Tower clocks database

 
List